Balasagun ( or  Balasagyn) was an ancient Sogdian city in modern-day Kyrgyzstan, located in the Chüy Valley between Bishkek and the Issyk-Kul lake. Located along the Silk Road, the ruins of the city were inscribed in 2014 on the UNESCO World Heritage List as part of the Silk Roads: the Routes Network of Chang'an-Tianshan Corridor World Heritage Site.

Balasagun was founded by the Sogdians, a people of Iranian origin and the Sogdian language was still in use in this town until the 11th century.

It was the capital of the Kara-Khanid Khanate from the 10th century until it was taken by the Qara Khitai (Western Liao dynasty) in 1134. It was then captured by the Mongols in 1218.  The Mongols called it Gobalik "Pretty City". It should not be confused with Karabalghasun, now Ordu-Baliq in Mongolia, which was the capital of the Uyghur Khaganate.

Founded by the Kara-Khanid Khanate in the ninth century, Balasagun soon supplanted Suyab as the main political and economical centre of the Chüy Valley; its prosperity declined after the Mongol conquest. The poet Yūsuf Balasaguni, known for writing the Kutadgu Bilig, is thought to have been born in Balasagun in the 11th century. The city also had a sizable Nestorian Christian population; one graveyard was still in use in the 14th century.

It includes the Burana Tower and a field of stone petroglyphs, the Kurgan stelae. The Burana Tower is a minaret built in the 11th century on the ruins of the ancient city Balasagun. Several earthquakes through the centuries caused much damage, and the current building represents a major renovation carried out in the 1970s.

References

Archaeological sites in Kyrgyzstan
Populated places along the Silk Road
Chüy Region
Former populated places in Kyrgyzstan
Sogdian cities
Destroyed cities